Bryan Alexander Ordóñez (born November 5, 1990) is a Guatemalan professional midfielder who currently plays for Liga Nacional club Xinabajul.

External links
 

1990 births
Guatemala international footballers
Comunicaciones F.C. players
Association football midfielders
Guatemalan footballers
Living people